McClure is a village in McClure Precinct, Alexander County, Illinois, United States. It was incorporated in 2004 and had a population of 256 at the 2020 census.

McClure is part of the Cape Girardeau–Jackson Metropolitan Statistical Area.

Geography

History
The community of McClure was established prior to 1836, the year its post office opened, and was originally known as Clear Creek Landing or Clear Creek. The community's name was changed to Wheatland in 1887 due to the large wheat fields in the region. Thomas J. McClure, for whose family the village was eventually named, moved to the village in 1842; he and his wife Caroline became prominent local farmers and raised seven children. Their son J. T. became the village postmaster, and he had the post office's name changed to McClure in 1895 to avoid confusion with the Wheaton, Illinois post office. By the 1930s, the village had two train stations, a sizable business district, and a population of roughly 400. The village has since declined and now has relatively few businesses.

The McClure family's house has been listed on the National Register of Historic Places.

Demographics

2020 census
Note: the US Census treats Hispanic/Latino as an ethnic category. This table excludes Latinos from the racial categories and assigns them to a separate category. Hispanics/Latinos can be of any race.

As of the 2020 census there were 256 people, 111 households, and 79 families residing in the village. The racial makeup of the village was 93.36% White, 1.17% African American, 0.78% from other races, and 4.69% from two or more races. Hispanic or Latino of any race were 0.78% of the population.

There were 111 households, out of which 15.32% had children under the age of 18 living with them, 47.75% were married couples living together, 22.52% had a female householder with no husband present, and 28.83% were non-families. 27.93% of all households were made up of individuals, and 12.61% had someone living alone who was 65 years of age or older. The average household size was 2.51 and the average family size was 2.17.

The village's age distribution consisted of 8.7% under the age of 18, 4.1% from 18 to 24, 14.6% from 25 to 44, 41.4% from 45 to 64, and 31.1% who were 65 years of age or older. The median age was 55.8 years. For every 100 females, there were 89.8 males. For every 100 females age 18 and over, there were 84.9 males.

The median income for a household in the village was $42,614, and the median income for a family was $51,250. Males had a median income of $28,958 versus $25,000 for females. The per capita income for the village was $23,432. About 19.0% of families and 18.8% of the population were below the poverty line, including 63.2% of those under age 18 and 14.7% of those age 65 or over.

References

Villages in Illinois
Villages in Alexander County, Illinois
Cape Girardeau–Jackson metropolitan area
1836 establishments in Illinois